Mochudi Centre Chiefs Sporting Club are a professional football club based in Gaborone, Botswana, who play in the Botswana first division following their relegation from the Premier League in 2019. Centre Chiefs have won the Botswana Premier League, the highest level of Botswana football, four times. The team originates from Mochudi, a large village on the outskirts of Gaborone.

History
Mochudi Centre Chiefs were founded in 1972 by local elders.

Centre Chiefs had their first major success in 2008 when they won the Botswana Premier League. The Chiefs then won back-to-back titles in 2011-12 and 2012-13. They subsequently won various cup competitions between 2008 and 2015. The club have enjoyed their greatest period of success in the past decade, winning 15 trophies since. Domestically, Mochudi Centre Chiefs have won four league titles, four Kabelano Charity Cups, One Coca-Cola Cup and One Super Cup, while in continental competitions they regularly compete in CAF Champions League.

Mochudi Centre Chiefs’ home kit colours are jet black and pearl white, while away colours are ruby red and pearl white. 
Mochudi Centre Chiefs has been owned by the Jamali and Letshwiti families.

The Chiefs players went on strike in 2018 after a payment dispute. After a difficult season, Chiefs were relegated to the second division with one game to play.

Sponsors
Boitekanelo College
Vega Fish Company

Achievements
Botswana Premier League: 4
Winners: 2007–08, 2011–12, 2012–13, 2014–15

FA Challenge Cup (Botswana): 1
2008

Performance in CAF competitions
CAF Cup: 2 appearances
1997 - Second Round
2000 - First Round
CAF Cup Winners' Cup: 1 appearance
1992 - First Round

Squad

Players

Staff
Assistant coach
  Pontsho Moloi

Notable players

Botswana
 Seabo Gabanakgosi
 Noah Kareng
 William Kehitilwe
 Sekhana Koko
 Barolong Lemmenyane
 Mpho Mabogo
 Kgosietsile Mampori
 Noah Maposa
 Oteng Moalosi	
 Lovemore Mokgweetsi
 Dirang Moloi
 Galabgwe Moyana
 Kekaetswe Moloi

 Raphael Nthwane
 Keitumetse Paul
 Molathegi Podile
 Jerome Ramatlhakwane
 Innocent Ranku
 Gobonyeone Selefa
 Thato Siska
 James Tshekedi

South Africa
 Tshweu Makhoere

Zambia
 Linos Chalwe
 James Kachinga
 Musonda Mweuke

Zimbabwe
 Itayi Gwandu
 Otsile Moje

Notable coaches
 Beston Chambeshi
 Mike Sithole (2007)
 Rahman Gumbo (2010)
 Dragojlo Stanojlović (2013–14)
 Mike Sithole (2014–present)

References

Association football clubs established in 1972
Football clubs in Mochudi
1972 establishments in Botswana